Parel is a neighborhood of Mumbai in India. It is also the Dutch word for a pearl, and may also refer to:
Parel (surname)
Grande Parel, a mountain in the French Alps
Parel railway station on the Mumbai Suburban Railway
Lower Parel railway station on the Mumbai Suburban Railway

See also
Parel van de Veluwe, a Dutch bicycle race
Parel Vallei, a suburb of Cape Town, South Africa